School of Human Genetic and Population Health  (SOHGAPH)  is a non-governmental organization registered under West Bengal Societies Registration Act, 1961, India.

SOHAGPH was founded in April 1993 by Dr. Deba Prasad Mukherjee, as a platform for anthropologists, physicians and biologists to launch service-oriented researches in the field of human genetics among West Bengal population.

In 2005, SOHAGPH is granted Bharat Nirman Award for the Area of Rural Development.

Activities

 Since 1993, SOHGAPH has been running a genetic counseling centre for the newborn. From 2003, family counseling about reproductive health was also included.
 In 2005, SOHGAPH began working with the governmental wing, West Bengal State AIDS Prevention & Control Society (WBSAP&C) as partner NGO.  Till now it has taken up targeted intervention among flying sex workers at 11 sites in Salt Lake City and 20 sites in Lake Town, Kolkata.
 From 2001 to 2007, SOHGAPH worked as partner under the network of Young People’s Reproductive and Sexual Health & Rights (YRSHR).

References

External links
 the official website of SOHGAPH

Organisations based in West Bengal
Scientific organizations established in 1993
Medical and health organisations based in India
1993 establishments in West Bengal